Maria T. Daviess (Thompson; also known as, Mrs. Maria Thompson Daviess; misspelled, Daveiss; pen names, unspecified; October 31, 1814 – December 19, 1896) was a 19th-century American author of Kentucky. Among her publications were Roger Sherman, a Tale of '76; Woman's Love; a volume of Poems; and History of Mercer and Boyle Counties.

Early life and education

Maria (sometimes "Marie") Thompson was born in Harrodsburg, Kentucky, October 31, 1814. Her parents were John B. Thompson, Sr., Harrodsburg, and Nancy (or Anne) Porter Robards (1790-1870); they married in 1807. Her brothers were John Burton Thompson (1810-1874); Henry Thompson (1812-1900); Charles Thompson (1818-1872); Philip B. Thompson (born 1820), who had twin sons Philip B. Thompson Jr. and John B. Thompson (who married Martha "Mattie" Anderson, a sister of the Harrodsburg-born writer Zoe Anderson Norris). Her sisters were Elizabeth Thompson (1822-1883); Ann Thompson (1826-1889); Susan Burton (Thompson) Massie (b. 1828); and Katherine (Thompson) Dun (1831-1894).

Daviess' two grandfathers, Capt. George Robards and Col. John Thompson, fought in the American Revolutionary War, married women of The Old Dominion, of which all four were natives, and soon after removed to Kentucky, settling on adjoining plantations. Drawn together by the common memories of their service in the field, their acquaintance ripened into friendship, which had the result of an alliance by marriage between the two families. In 1807, Nancy Robards and John B. Thompson married, and, after a short residence on their farm, removed to Harrodsburg, where they resided thereafter, Mr. Thompson practicing his profession, the law, and occasionally serving in the Legislature of his State. He was a member of the State Senate when the cholera epidemic occurred in 1833, which claimed his life.

The death of the father, Mr. Thompson seriously affected his family’s future. But the mother assured that her four sons received liberal educations, and her daughters had such educational opportunities as the village school in Harrodsburg afforded,  which was then among the best in the West.

Daviess had every opportunity to acquire social distinction. Residing in Harrodsburg, which every summer for many years was a resort of fashion and culture, she was brought in constant contact with the élite of Southern and Western society that for six months of the year thronged this town.

Career
Daviess’s writings, especially poetry, were not the result of her training in belles-lettres, but rather the overflow of feeling and fancy that would not be repressed. Her coming before the public was not with the intention of ever writing professionally, nor the pursuit of fame. A bridal compliment to a friend was so kindly received, that, by request from one and another editor, Daviess published many works in various newspapers, seldom under her own name, but signed by such a pen name as the passing fancy suggested. Her effusions were extensively copied, and complimented for their smooth flow of rhyme and almost redundant beauty of expression. "The Nun" was the most elaborate poem she ever published. "A Harvest Hymn" offers a spirit of gratitude. Most of Daviess’s manuscripts and copies of her published articles were destroyed by an accident.  Roger Sherman, A Tale of '76 and Woman's Love, are her best-known stories. 

For some years after her marriage, in 1839, Daviess did not write much. The first works of Daviess’s revived authorship were "Roger Sherman — A Tale of ’76", and "Woman’s Love"; both very well-conceived and sustained stories. But her strong conviction that the plain, practical duties of life should command, if necessary, the whole of every woman’s time, tinged her themes. Her later writings seem to have been a kind of photograph of her everyday life. She received from the Kentucky State Agricultural Society a premium for the essay on the "Cultivation and Uses of Chinese Sugar-Cane," a product she was the first to introduce into the State,  prophesying it would, as it did, become a staple of the West. Subsequently, she was awarded a diploma for an essay upon some literary theme by the National Fair, held in St. Louis in the 1860s.

For some time, she was special contributor to several leading agricultural papers. She was a regular correspondent of The Country Gentleman and Coleman's Rural World. Her last contribution for The Country Gentleman was written on her eighty-second birthday. Her letters in these journals were among their most charming features. Daviess could please her readers with explanations of the useful as much as descriptions of the beautiful, often blending the two together in a manner thought to be quite her own. Starting in 1885 she taught at Daughters College in Harrodsburg, with colleagues including Zoe Anderson Norris.

Many of Daviess' neighbors were unaware that she "wrote for publication," as she seemed to mingle literary habits easily with the responsibilities of a large family.

Personal life

In 1839, she married Maj. William Newton Daviess (1811-1881), son of Capt. Samuel Daviess, and nephew of Col. Joseph Hamilton Daveiss. Maj. William Daviess lived on a beautiful estate called "Hayfields," at 122 East Poplar Street, near Harrodsburg. He was celebrated throughout the State as a raconteur, a historian, a student of human nature, a great reader of books, as well as men; he had a strong judicial mind, having been educated for the law. In the State Senate Maj. Daviess represented his district for two years and at one time when offered a nomination for Congress, declined, saying that "politics sooner or later engulfs men's souls," and he might not be able to withstand the temptations offered. Thereafter, he lived the life of a "Latin farmer," with his home always open to strangers and friends.

The couple had at least two daughters, Hannah Daviess Pittman, of St. Louis, Missouri, and Annie T. Daviess; as well as at least one son, John Burton T. Daviess, the father of artist and novelist, Maria Thompson Daviess, for whom Daviess was a role model.

Death and legacy
Daviess died in Harrodsburg, December 19, 1896. In 1886, Daviess published a History of Mercer and Boyle Counties, Ky., in installments in the Harrodsburg Democrat. It was republished in 1924 in book form. D. M. Hutton, Editor The Harrodsburg Herald, wrote the preface to the 1924 publication of History of Mercer and Boyle Counties, Ky.:—

Selected works

Poetry
 "Cultivation and Uses of the Chinese Sugar-Cane"
 "The Nun"
 "A Harvest Hymn"

Books
 Poems
 Roger Sherman, A Tale of '76
 Woman's Love
 History of Mercer and Boyle Counties (1886, in the columns of the Harrodsburg Democrat)
 History of Mercer and Boyle Counties (1924; book)

References

Attribution
 
 
 
 
 
 
 
 

1814 births
1896 deaths
19th-century American poets
19th-century American women writers
19th-century American essayists
19th-century American historians
19th-century pseudonymous writers
Kentucky women historians
Writers from Kentucky
People from Harrodsburg, Kentucky
Pseudonymous women writers
Kentucky women writers